Tehranno is one of the eastern neighborhoods in Tehran. It is located in region 13 of Tehran.  It has 4 small squares, named Chaychi, Ettela'at, Ashtiani, and Lozi, respectively.  However, Ashtiani Square has been torn down, because of the Bagheri highway's construction.

Before the Islamic Revolution, some of the streets were named by the words beginning with "Mehr," such as Mehrbar, Mehrafrooz, Mehrpoo, Mehravar, Mehrjoo, and Mehrayin.  The previous name of Lozi Square was Mehr Square, but during the war between Iraq and Iran, some were renamed after people killed in the war. Other streets are named after famous poets, such as Hafez, Saadi Shirazi, Roodaki, Sa'eb Tabrizi, Bou'ali, Sanayi, Ferdosi, and Molavi.

The boundaries of Tehranno are Damavand Street in the north, Piroozi in the south, Nirooye Havayi in the west, and Bagheri and Dowran Expressway in the east.

Parks near Tehranno include Piroozi Park, Avesta Park, Danesh Amooz Park, and Saba Park.  Sorkheh Hesar Forest in the east of Tehranno is a well-used recreation area.
 
The nearest neighborhoods to Tehranno are Tehranpars, Narmak, Vahidieh, Nezam abad (North), Tehran shargh (East), Nirooye havayi (West).

References

External links 

Neighbourhoods in Tehran